Volga-Dnepr Group is a Russian airline holding company headquartered in Moscow. It is a world leader in the global market for the movement of oversize, unique and heavy air cargo. The group’s core business activities are charter cargo operations using Antonov An-124 and IL-76TD-90VD heavy transporters and scheduled cargo operations using Boeing 747 and Boeing 737 freighters.

Subsidiaries

 AirBridgeCargo
 ATRAN Airlines
 Volga-Dnepr Airlines

Volga-Dnepr Airlines is the main subsidiary of the group, which operates a fleet of twelve Antonov An-124 and five Ilyushin IL-76, for international charter services of oversized and heavy cargo. AirBridgeCargo is one of the largest carriers in the international scheduled cargo market. It operates scheduled cargo operations using the fleet of Boeing 747-400 and Boeing 747-8F. ATRAN Airlines, originally established in 1942 became a subsidiary of Volga-Dnepr in 2011. ATRAN operates Boeing 737's from Vnukovo and Sheremetyevo airports in Moscow, for short and medium-haul flights.

Group Fleet 

As of June 2020 the Volga-Dnepr Group fleet consists of the following aircraft;

References

External links
 

Airlines of Russia
Holding companies of Russia
Companies based in Moscow